Somatina pythiaria is a moth of the  family Geometridae. It is found in Ethiopia and South Africa.

References

Moths described in 1858
Scopulini
Insects of Ethiopia
Moths of Africa